The 1989–90 Gonzaga Bulldogs men's basketball team represented Gonzaga University in the West Coast Conference (WCC) during the 1989–90 NCAA Division I men's basketball season. Led by eighth-year head coach Dan Fitzgerald, the Bulldogs were  overall in the regular season  and played their home games on campus at the Charlotte Y. Martin Centre (formerly known as Kennedy Pavilion) in Spokane, Washington.

Their first tournament wins came two years later in 1992; they advanced to the final, but fell by three to top-seeded Pepperdine.

Postseason results

|-
!colspan=6 style=| WCC tournament

References

External links
Sports Reference – Gonzaga Bulldogs men's basketball – 1989–90 season

Gonzaga Bulldogs men's basketball seasons
Gonzaga
1989 in sports in Washington (state)
1990 in sports in Washington (state)